Srinivas (7 November 1959) is an Indian playback singer and music composer. Best known for his work in Tamil films and all the other South Indian and Hindi language films, Srinivas has recorded over 3000 songs. He has also recorded songs for many non-film albums, tele-series, devotionals and classical collaborations.

Srinivas debuted into playback singer through the song "Sorgam Enbathu Namakku" from the film Nammavar (1994) and shot to fame with the song "Maana Madurai" from the film Minsara Kanavu (1997) which was composed by A. R. Rahman. Apart from Rahman, he recorded many hundreds of songs for composers such as Vidyasagar, Mani Sharma, Koti, Deva, Hamsalekha and others.

Recorded film songs 
This is only a partial list; Srinivas has sung over 3000 songs in Tamil, Hindi, Kannada, Telugu, Malayalam and Marathi.

Tamil film songs

1990s

2000s

2010s

Telugu songs

1990s

2000s

2010s

Kannada songs

Malayalam songs

Hindi songs

Serial songs

References

Srinivas